Nungubon Sitlerchai is a Thai former Muay Thai fighter and boxer. He was a 4 weights Lumpinee Stadium champion during the golden era of Muay Thai.

Biography & career

Nungubon started Muay Thai at the age of 7 at home. Around 16 years old he joined the Por Muang Ubon gym and began fighting in Bangkok stadiums two years later.
Being born with one leg shorter than the other didn't prevent him from becoming a dominant champion in Bangkok, winning four Lumpinee Stadium titles between 1990 and 1999.

Nungubon owns victories over 8 different Fighter of the Year award recipients: Langsuan Panyuthaphum (KO), Kaensak Sor.Ploenjit, Jaroensap Kiatbanchong, Wangchannoi Sor Palangchai (KO), Kaolan Kaovichit, Saenchai Sor.Kingstar, Fahsuchon Sit-Or and Thongchai Tor.Silachai.

After his fighting career Nungubon opened his own gym Sit Nungubon in his native province of Ubon Ratchathani.

Titles & honours

Muay Thai
Lumpinee Stadium
 1990 Lumpinee Stadium 105 lbs Champion
 1991 Lumpinee Stadium 112 lbs Champion
 1995 Lumpinee Stadium 115 lbs Champion
 1996 Lumpinee Stadium Fight of the Year (vs Hansuk Prasathinpanomrung on July 26th)
 1996 Lumpinee Stadium Fighter of the Year 
 1999 Lumpinee Stadium 118 lbs Champion

Boxing
Pan Asian Boxing Association
 1996 PABA Super Flyweight Champion (2 defenses)

Muay Thai record

|-  style="background:#fbb;"
| 2013-07-21 || Loss||align=left| Lakhin Wassandasit ||  || Bangkok, Thailand || Decision || 5 || 3:00
|-  style="background:#fbb;"
| 2013-12- || Loss||align=left| Jaroensap Kiatbanchong || Lumpinee Stadium  || Bangkok, Thailand || Decision || 5 || 3:00
|-  style="background:#fbb;"
| 2013-03- || Loss||align=left| Jaroensap Kiatbanchong ||  Rajadamnern Stadium || Bangkok, Thailand || Decision || 5 || 3:00
|-  style="background:#fbb;"
| 2008-12-13 || Loss ||align=left| Valdet Gashi || The Champions Club Germany 2008|| Germany || Decision || 5 || 3:00
|-  bgcolor="#fbb"
| 2003-09-12 || Loss ||align=left| Thailand Pinsinchai ||  Lumpinee Stadium || Bangkok, Thailand || Decision || 5 || 3:00
|-  style="background:#cfc;"
| 2003-06-15 || Win ||align=left| Nampet Sit.Or || Channel 7 Stadium || Bangkok, Thailand || Decision || 5 || 3:00

|-  style="background:#fbb;"
| 2003-05- || Loss||align=left| Phetek Kityongyut || Lumpinee Stadium || Bangkok, Thailand || Decision || 5 || 3:00
|-  style="background:#cfc;"
| 2003-03-23 || Win ||align=left| Sitthichai Kiyarat || Channel 7 Stadium || Bangkok, Thailand || Decision || 5 || 3:00
|-  style="background:#;"
| 2002-01-11 || ||align=left| Chalermpol Kiatsunanta || Lumpinee Stadium || Bangkok, Thailand || ||  ||
|-  style="background:#cfc;"
| ? || Win ||align=left| Tubnar Sitromsai  || Rajadamnern Stadium || Bangkok, Thailand || Decision ||5  ||3:00
|-  bgcolor="#fbb"
| 2001- || Loss ||align=left| Anuwat Kaewsamrit ||  || Bangkok, Thailand || Decision || 5 || 3:00
|-  style="background:#cfc;"
| 2001-06-12 ||Win ||align=left| Rungrawee Sor.Ploenchit  || Lumpinee Stadium || Bangkok, Thailand || Decision || 5 || 3:00
|-  style="background:#cfc;"
| 2001-05-25 || Win ||align=left| Fahsuchon Sit-O || Lumpinee Stadium || Bangkok, Thailand || Decision || 5 || 3:00
|-  style="background:#cfc;"
| 2001-04-22 || Win ||align=left| Rungrawee Sor.Ploenchit  || Channel 7 Stadium || Bangkok, Thailand || Decision ||5  ||3:00
|-  style="background:#fbb;"
| 2001-02-06 || Loss ||align=left| Yodbuangam Lukbanyai  || || Bangkok, Thailand || Decision ||5  ||3:00
|-  style="background:#;"
| 2001-01-19 || ||align=left| Sanghiran Lukbanyai || Lumpinee Stadium || Bangkok, Thailand || ||  ||
|-  style="background:#c5d2ea;"
| 2000-09-02 || Draw ||align=left| Phet-to Sitjaopho || Lumpinee Stadium || Bangkok, Thailand || Decision || 5 || 3:00
|-  style="background:#;"
| 1999-06-04 || ||align=left| Chalamkhao Kiatpanthong || Lumpinee Stadium || Bangkok, Thailand ||  ||  ||
|-  style="background:#fbb;"
| 1999- || Loss ||align=left| Saenchai Sor. Kingstar|| Lumpinee Stadium || Bangkok, Thailand || Decision || 5 || 3:00
|-
! style=background:white colspan=9 |
|-  style="background:#cfc;"
| 1999-03-05 || Win ||align=left| Saenchai Sor. Kingstar|| Lumpinee Stadium || Bangkok, Thailand || Decision (Split) || 5 || 3:00
|-
! style=background:white colspan=9 |
|-  style="background:#cfc;"
| 1999-02-05 || Win ||align=left| Chansak Singklongsi || Lumpinee Stadium || Bangkok, Thailand || Decision || 5 || 3:00
|-  style="background:#fbb;"
| 1999-01-12 || Loss||align=left| Chalamkhao Kiatpanthong || Lumpinee Stadium || Bangkok, Thailand || Decision || 5 || 3:00
|-  style="background:#cfc;"
| 1998-11-13 || Win ||align=left| Khunpinit Kiatthawan || Lumpinee Stadium || Bangkok, Thailand || Decision || 5 || 3:00
|-  style="background:#fbb;"
| 1998-05-26 || Loss||align=left| Sot Loognongyangtoy|| Lumpinee Stadium || Bangkok, Thailand || Decision|| 5 ||3:00
|-  style="background:#fbb;"
| 1998-03-02 || Loss ||align=left| Newsaencherng Pinsinchai || Rajadamnern Stadium || Bangkok, Thailand || Decision || 5 || 3:00
|-  style="background:#fbb;"
| 1997-09-05 || Loss ||align=left| Kochasarn Singklonksi|| Lumpinee Stadium || Bangkok, Thailand || Decision || 5 || 3:00
|-  style="background:#cfc;"
| 1996-11-29 ||Win ||align=left| Kaolan Kaovichit || Lumpinee Stadium || Bangkok, Thailand || KO (Punches) || 2 ||
|-  style="background:#fbb;"
| 1996-10-11 || Loss ||align=left| Rittichai Lookchaomaesaitong || Lumpinee Stadium || Bangkok, Thailand || Decision || 5 || 3:00
|-
! style=background:white colspan=9 |
|-  style="background:#cfc;"
| 1996-08-23 ||Win ||align=left| Hansuk Prasathinpanomrung || Lumpinee Stadium || Bangkok, Thailand || Decision || 5 || 3:00
|-  style="background:#cfc;"
| 1996-07-26 ||Win ||align=left| Hansuk Prasathinpanomrung || Lumpinee Stadium || Bangkok, Thailand || Decision || 5 || 3:00
|-  style="background:#cfc;"
| 1996-06-25 ||Win ||align=left| Baiphet Loogjaomaesaiwaree|| Lumpinee Stadium || Bangkok, Thailand || Decision || 5 || 3:00
|-  style="background:#cfc;"
| 1996-05-03 || Win ||align=left| Rittichai Lookchaomaesaitong || Lumpinee Stadium || Bangkok, Thailand || Decision || 5 || 3:00
|-  style="background:#cfc;"
| 1996-03-26 || Win ||align=left| Dao Udon Sor.Suchart || Lumpinee Stadium || Bangkok, Thailand || Decision || 5 || 3:00
|-  style="background:#c5d2ea;"
| 1996-02-13 || Draw ||align=left| Dao Udon Sor.Suchart || Lumpinee Stadium || Bangkok, Thailand || Decision || 5 || 3:00

|- style="background:#cfc;"
| 1995-11-17 || Win||align=left| Chaiyai Sittheppitak || Lumpinee Stadium ||  Bangkok, Thailand  || Decision || 5 || 3:00
|-  style="text-align:center; background:#fbb;"
| 1995-09-30 ||Loss||align=left| Dokmaipa Por Pongsawang || Lumpinee Stadium || Bangkok, Thailand || Decision || 5 || 3:00
|- style="background:#fbb;"
| 1995-08-25 || Loss||align=left| Kaensak Sor.Ploenjit || Lumpinee Stadium ||  Bangkok, Thailand  || Decision || 5 || 3:00
|-  style="background:#cfc;"
| 1995-06-30 ||Win ||align=left| Dokmaipa Por Pongsawang || Lumpinee Stadium || Bangkok, Thailand || Decision || 5 || 3:00
|-  style="background:#cfc;"
| 1995-06-09 ||Win||align=left|  Nongnarong Looksamrong || Lumpinee Stadium || Bangkok, Thailand || Decision || 5 || 3:00
|- style="background:#cfc;"
| 1995-04-28 || Win ||align=left| Yodsiam Sor.Prantalay || Lumpinee Stadium ||  Bangkok, Thailand  || Decision ||5 ||3:00 
|-
! style=background:white colspan=9 |
|- style="background:#c5d2ea;"
| 1995-02-22 || Draw||align=left| Sornsuknoi Sakwichan || Lumpinee Stadium || Bangkok, Thailand || Decision || 5||3:00
|-  style="background:#cfc;"
| 1995-01-03 || Win ||align=left| Thongchai Tor.Silachai || Lumpinee Stadium || Bangkok, Thailand || Decision || 5 || 3:00
|-  style="background:#cfc;"
| 1994-11-15 ||Win||align=left|  Nongnarong Looksamrong || Lumpinee Stadium || Bangkok, Thailand || Decision || 5 || 3:00
|- style="background:#fbb;"
| 1994-08-27 || Loss||align=left| Yokthai Sithoar  || Lumpinee Stadium || Bangkok, Thailand || Decision || 5||3:00

|- style="background:#fbb;"
| 1994-08-09 || Loss||align=left| Yokthai Sithoar  || Lumpinee Stadium || Bangkok, Thailand || Decision || 5||3:00
|- style="background:#fbb;"
| 1994-06-28 || Loss||align=left| Saengmorakot Sor.Ploenchit  || Lumpinee Stadium || Bangkok, Thailand || Decision || 5||3:00
|- style="background:#fbb;"
| 1994-05-31 || Loss||align=left| Meechok Sor.Ploenchit  || Lumpinee Stadium || Bangkok, Thailand || Decision || 5||3:00
|- style="background:#cfc;"
| 1994-03-25 || Win||align=left| Kaensak Sor.Ploenjit|| Lumpinee Stadium ||  Bangkok, Thailand || Decision || 5 || 3:00
|- style="background:#cfc;"
| 1994-03-04 || Win ||align=left| Samkor Chor.Rathchatasupak  || Lumpinee Stadium || Bangkok, Thailand || TKO (Punches)|| 3 ||
|- style="background:#fbb;"
| 1994-01-28 || Loss||align=left| Samkor Chor.Rathchatasupak  || Lumpinee Stadium || Bangkok, Thailand || Decision || 5||3:00
|-  style="background:#cfc;"
| 1993-12-03 ||Win ||align=left| Silapathai Jockygym|| Lumpinee Stadium || Bangkok, Thailand || Decision || 5 || 3:00
|-  style="background:#cfc;"
| 1993-10-22 ||Win ||align=left| Hansuk Prasathinpanomrung || Lumpinee Stadium || Bangkok, Thailand || Decision || 5 || 3:00
|- style="background:#fbb;"
| 1993-09-17 || Loss ||align=left| Kaensak Sor.Ploenjit|| Lumpinee Stadium ||  Bangkok, Thailand || Decision || 5 || 3:00
|-  style="background:#cfc;"
| 1993-08-08 ||Win ||align=left| Rittidet Kerdpayak || Lumpinee Stadium || Bangkok, Thailand || Decision || 5 || 3:00
|- style="background:#fbb;"
| 1993-06-25 || Loss||align=left| Karuhat Sor.Supawan || Lumpinee Stadium ||  Bangkok, Thailand  || Decision || 5 || 3:00
|- style="background:#fbb;"
| 1993-06-08 ||Loss ||align=left| Jaroensap Kiatbanchong || Lumpinee Stadium ||  Bangkok, Thailand  || Decision || 5 || 3:00
|- style="background:#fbb;"
| 1993-03-16 || Loss||align=left| Karuhat Sor.Supawan || Lumpinee Stadium ||  Bangkok, Thailand  || Decision || 5 || 3:00
|-  style="background:#fbb;"
| 1993-02-05 ||Loss ||align=left| Jaroensap Kiatbanchong || Lumpinee Stadium || Bangkok, Thailand || Decision || 5 || 3:00
|-  style="background:#fbb;"
| 1993-01- ||Loss ||align=left| Jaroensap Kiatbanchong || Lumpinee Stadium || Bangkok, Thailand || Decision || 5 || 3:00
|-  style="background:#cfc;"
| 1992-12-04 ||Win ||align=left| Duansomgpong Por Pongsawang || Lumpinee Stadium || Bangkok, Thailand || Decision || 5 || 3:00
|-  style="background:#fbb;"
| 1992-09-04 || Loss||align=left| Pompetch Kiatchatpayak || Lumpinee Stadium || Bangkok, Thailand || Referee stoppage|| 5 ||

|- style="background:#cfc;"
| 1992-07-27 || Win||align=left| Karuhat Sor.Supawan  || Lumpinee Stadium ||  Bangkok, Thailand  || Referee Stoppage || 5 || 

|-  style="background:#cfc;"
| 1992-06-30 ||Win ||align=left| Wangchannoi Sor Palangchai || Lumpinee Stadium || Bangkok, Thailand || KO || 2 ||
|- style="background:#fbb;"
| 1992-05-27 ||Loss ||align=left| Veeraphol Sahaprom || Lumpinee Stadium ||  Bangkok, Thailand  || Decision || 5 || 3:00

|-  style="background:#c5d2ea;"
| 1992-05-05 ||NC ||align=left| Duangsompong Por Pongsawang || Lumpinee Stadium || Bangkok, Thailand || Referee stoppage||  ||
|-  style="background:#fbb;"
| 1992-03- ||Loss ||align=left| Dokmaipa Por Pongsawang || Lumpinee Stadium || Bangkok, Thailand || Decision || 5 || 3:00
|-  style="background:#fbb;"
| 1992-01-31 ||Loss ||align=left| Dokmaipa Por Pongsawang || Lumpinee Stadium || Bangkok, Thailand || Decision || 5 || 3:00
|-  style="background:#cfc;"
| 1992-01-07 ||Win ||align=left| Panphet Muangsurin || Lumpinee Stadium || Bangkok, Thailand || Decision || 5 || 3:00
|-  style="background:#fbb;"
| ? ||Loss ||align=left|  Nongnarong Looksamrong || Lumpinee Stadium || Bangkok, Thailand || Decision || 5 || 3:00
|- style="background:#cfc;"
| 1991-12-06 || Win ||align=left| Chainoi Muangsurin || Lumpinee Stadium ||  Bangkok, Thailand  || Decision ||5 ||3:00
|- style="background:#cfc;"
| 1991-11-05 || Win ||align=left| Chainoi Muangsurin || Lumpinee Stadium ||  Bangkok, Thailand  || Decision ||5 ||3:00
|- style="background:#fbb;"
| 1991-10-18 || Loss||align=left| Karuhat Sor.Supawan || Lumpinee Stadium ||  Bangkok, Thailand  || Decision || 5 || 3:00
|- style="background:#cfc;"
| 1991-09-17 || Win ||align=left| Langsuan Panyuthaphum || Lumpinee Stadium ||  Bangkok, Thailand  || KO|| ||
|- style="background:#cfc;"
| 1991-08-06 || Win ||align=left| Langsuan Panyuthaphum || Lumpinee Stadium ||  Bangkok, Thailand  || KO || 4|| 
|-
! style=background:white colspan=9 |
|- style="background:#cfc;"
| 1991-06-28 || Win ||align=left| Jaroensap Kiatbanchong || Lumpinee Stadium ||  Bangkok, Thailand  || Decision ||5 ||3:00
|- style="background:#cfc;"
| 1991-06-14 || Win ||align=left| Pairojnoi Sor Siamchai || Lumpinee Stadium ||  Bangkok, Thailand  || Decision ||5 ||3:00
|- style="background:#cfc;"
| 1991-04- || Win ||align=left| Pornsak Muangsurin || Lumpinee Stadium ||  Bangkok, Thailand  || Decision ||5 ||3:00
|- style="background:#fbb;"
| 1991-03-31 || Loss ||align=left| Dokmaipa Por Pongsawang || Lumpinee Stadium ||  Bangkok, Thailand  || Decision ||5 ||3:00
|-  style="background:#fbb;"
| 1991-03-01 ||Loss ||align=left| Pongsiri Por Ruamrudee || Lumpinee Stadium || Bangkok, Thailand || Decision || 5 || 3:00
|- style="background:#cfc;"
| 1991-02-12 || Win ||align=left| Paruhatlek Sitchunthong || Lumpinee Stadium ||  Bangkok, Thailand  || Decision ||5 ||3:00
|- style="background:#cfc;"
| 1991-01-21 || Win ||align=left| Sornsuknoi Sakwichan || Rajadamnern Stadium ||  Bangkok, Thailand  || Decision ||5 ||3:00
|-  style="background:#fbb;"
| 1990-12-04 || Loss ||align=left| Morakot Sor Thamarangsri || Lumpinee Stadium || Bangkok, Thailand || Decision || 5 || 3:00
|-  style="background:#fbb;"
| 1990-11-03 || Loss ||align=left| Pornsak Muangsurin || Lumpinee Stadium || Bangkok, Thailand || Decision || 5 || 3:00
|-  style="background:#fbb;"
| 1990-09-28 || Loss ||align=left| D-Day Kiatmungkan || Lumpinee Stadium || Bangkok, Thailand || Decision || 5 || 3:00
|- style="background:#cfc;"
| 1990-09-11 || Win ||align=left| Khanunthong JohnnyGym || Rajadamnern Stadium ||  Bangkok, Thailand  || Decision ||5 ||3:00
|-  style="background:#fbb;"
| 1990-08-21 || Loss ||align=left| Thongchai Tor.Silachai || Lumpinee Stadium || Bangkok, Thailand || Decision || 5 || 3:00
|-
! style=background:white colspan=9 |
|-  style="background:#fbb;"
| 1990-07-20 || Loss||align=left| Hippy Singmanee || Lumpinee Stadium || Bangkok, Thailand || Decision || 5 || 3:00
|-  style="background:#fbb;"
| 1990-06-25 || Loss ||align=left| Kompayak Singmanee || Rajadamnern Stadium || Bangkok, Thailand || Decision || 5 || 3:00
|-  style="background:#cfc;"
| 1990-06-08 || Win ||align=left| Saengdaw Kiatanan || Lumpinee Stadium || Bangkok, Thailand || Decision || 5 || 3:00
|-  style="background:#cfc;
| 1990-05-15 || Win ||align=left| Hippy Singmanee || Lumpinee Stadium || Bangkok, Thailand || Decision || 5 || 3:00
|-  style="background:#fbb;"
| 1990-04-24 || Loss ||align=left| Thongchai Tor.Silachai || Lumpinee Stadium || Bangkok, Thailand || Decision || 5 || 3:00
|- style="background:#cfc;"
| 1990-03-30 || Win ||align=left| Kompayak Singmanee || Lumpinee Stadium ||  Bangkok, Thailand  || Decision ||5 ||3:00 
|-
! style=background:white colspan=9 |
|- style="background:#c5d2ea;"
| 1990-03-06 || Draw||align=left| Jaroensap Kiatbanchong || Lumpinee Stadium ||  Bangkok, Thailand  || Decision ||5 ||3:00 
|-  style="background:#cfc;"
| 1990-02-06 || Win ||align=left| Methanoi Sor Maliwan || Lumpinee Stadium || Bangkok, Thailand || Decision || 5 || 3:00
|-  style="background:#cfc;"
| 1990-01-20 || Win ||align=left| Thongchai Tor.Silachai || Lumpinee Stadium || Bangkok, Thailand || Decision || 5 || 3:00
|-  style="background:#cfc;"
| 1990-01-06 || Win ||align=left| Kengkajnoi Sor.Weerakul || Lumpinee Stadium || Bangkok, Thailand || Decision || 5 || 3:00
|-  style="background:#fbb;"
| 1989-11-03 || Loss ||align=left| Chandet Sor Prantalay || Lumpinee Stadium || Bangkok, Thailand || Decision  || 5 || 3:00

|-  style="background:#fbb;"
| 1989-09-09 || Loss ||align=left| Khwanla Sitbangprachan ||  || Bangkok, Thailand || Decision || 5 || 3:00

|-  style="background:#fbb;"
| 1989-06-13 || Loss ||align=left| Jaroensap Kiatbanchong || Lumpinee Stadium || Bangkok, Thailand || Decision || 5 || 3:00
|-  style="background:#fbb;"
| 1989-05-12 || Loss ||align=left| Tuktathong Por Pongsawang || Lumpinee Stadium || Bangkok, Thailand || Decision || 5 || 3:00

|-  style="background:#fbb;"
| 1989-04-11 || Loss ||align=left| Khwanla Sitbangprachan ||  || Bangkok, Thailand || Decision || 5 || 3:00

|-  style="background:#cfc;"
| 1989-03-06 || Win ||align=left| Methanoi Sor Maliwan || Rajadamnern Stadium || Bangkok, Thailand || Decision || 5 || 3:00

|-  style="background:#fbb;"
| 1989-01-07 || Loss ||align=left| Khwanla Sitbangprachan ||  || Bangkok, Thailand || Decision || 5 || 3:00

|-  style="background:#cfc;"
| 1988-12-16 || Win ||align=left| Sangpetchnoi Chor.Maylada || Lumpinee Stadium || Bangkok, Thailand || Decision || 5 || 3:00
|-  style="background:#cfc;"
| 1988-10-11 || Win ||align=left| Wisanlek Lukbangplasoi || Lumpinee Stadium || Bangkok, Thailand || Decision || 5 || 3:00
|-  style="background:#cfc;"
| 1988-05-03 || Win ||align=left| Thanufai Sor.Ploenchit || Lumpinee Stadium || Bangkok, Thailand || Decision || 5 || 3:00
|-
| colspan=9 | Legend:

References

External links
 

1971 births
Living people
Nungubon Sitlerchai
Nungubon Sitlerchai